Lionel Joseph Wilson (March 14, 1915 – January 23, 1998) was an American political figure and a member of the Democratic Party. He was the first black mayor of Oakland, California, serving three terms as mayor of Oakland from 1977 until 1991.

Biography
Born March 14, 1915, Wilson was the eldest of eight children of Louise Barrios and Julius Wilson in New Orleans, Louisiana. By 1920, the family had moved to Oakland, California, where his father worked as a plasterer in building construction. Wilson was educated in the public schools, and in 1932 graduated from McClymonds High School.

Wilson attended UC Berkeley, graduating with an A.B. in economics in 1939. During 1939 to 1943, he was a semi-professional baseball player, pitching for the Oakland Larks club as part of the short-lived West Coast Negro Baseball League. On January 4, 1943, during World War II he enlisted in the U.S. Army, rising to the rank of Sergeant. After his discharge, he continued his studies at University of California, Hastings College of the Law, receiving his LL.B. in 1949. In January 1950, he was admitted to the State Bar of California and began a private practice with George Vaughns.

In 1953 and 1955, Wilson ran for the Berkeley City Council. He then formed the law firm Wilson, Metoyer & Sweeney (later joined by Allen Broussard).  In 1961, Governor Pat Brown appointed Wilson a judge of the Alameda County Municipal Court (becoming the first African American judge in California), and then in 1964 Brown elevated Wilson to serve as a judge of the Alameda County Superior Court. In 1962, he joined the Metropolitan Oakland YMCA's Board of Directors.

In 1977, Wilson won the election for mayor of Oakland, defeating Oakland school board president, Dave Tucker. While mayor, Wilson addressed development in downtown Oakland, including extension of Bay Area Rapid Transit to the city, and one natural disaster: the 1989 Loma Prieta earthquake. He lost the 1990 mayoral election to Elihu Harris after making an expensive and unsuccessful bid to return the then Los Angeles Raiders to Oakland.

In 1991, Wilson nominated himself to serve on the Oakland Board of Port Commissioners, being appointed by the Oakland City Council after losing his mayoral bid. He served on the port commission for a year, working under his appointee and then-President Carole Ward Allen of the board of port commissioners. Elihu Harris had him removed from the port in 1992.

Wilson was a member of Alpha Phi Alpha fraternity. He, along with Allen Broussard, was also part of the coterie that used to gather at the pharmacy of William Byron Rumford, another important African American in Northern California politics.

Lionel Wilson died on January 23, 1998, of cancer; he was 82.

Honors and legacy
The office building at 150 Frank H. Ogawa Plaza, called  the Broadway Building (formerly the First National Bank Building), is named in his honor. In 2002, Aspire Public Schools founded a small 6-12 grade school called "Lionel Wilson College Preparatory Academy" in Oakland. Also, at Oakland International Airport, Terminal 2, which houses Southwest Airlines and their airplane flights, is named the "Lionel J. Wilson Terminal."

Personal life
Wilson married twice. With his first wife, Gloria, he had three sons: Steve, and twins Robin and Lionel. On August 12, 1950, he remarried to Dorothy P. McGuinness in Los Angeles. His brothers include Harold, Kermit, Julius and Warren Barrios Wilson, who was also an attorney in Oakland.

See also
 Allen Broussard
 Carole Ward Allen
 Wiley Manuel
 Janice Rogers Brown

References

External links
 Lionel J. Wilson collection. Oakland Museum of California.
 Guide to the Lionel J. Wilson collection. African American Museum and Library, Oakland Public Library. Online Archive of California.
 Lionel J. Wilson. Oakland Local Wiki.

African-American judges
African-American mayors in California
1915 births
1998 deaths
Mayors of Oakland, California
California state court judges
Superior court judges in the United States
African-American lawyers
American jurists
UC Berkeley College of Letters and Science alumni
University of California, Hastings College of the Law alumni
United States Army personnel of World War II
Deaths from cancer in California
Oakland Larks players
20th-century African-American politicians
20th-century American lawyers
20th-century American judges
20th-century American politicians